"Sounds of the Skeng" is a song by English rapper Stormzy, released on 6 September 2019.

Promotion
Stormzy revealed the song on 29 August 2019, posting a picture with the caption "You lot think you're fucking funny yeah kool 🥊 6/9/19 #SoundsOfTheSkeng" A teaser of the song preceded its release.

Reception
Clashs Robin Murray described "Sounds of the Skeng" as "a muscular workout from Stormzy, a bass-bin rattler that taps into his incredible live energy". Aron A. of HotNewHipHop called the song "a hard-hitting banger that serves as a reminder of his grime roots". Writing for Complex, James Keith stated that it "sees Stormzy at his most direct, calling out the fakes and those too keen to seek the approval of US artists, all while Spyro's snarling bass line glowers menacingly in the background".

Rolling Stones Emily Zemler described "Sounds of the Skeng" as a "fast-talking track" and a "hard-punching number". David Renshaw of The Fader called the song "a skippy and light-hearted moment".

Personnel
Credits adapted from Tidal.

 Stormzy – vocals
 Sir Spyro – production, programming
 Joker – mixing, mastering

Charts

References

2019 singles
2019 songs
Stormzy songs
Songs written by Stormzy